Barbara Haviland Minor is an American chemical engineer who has worked at DuPont (between 1981 and 2015) and Chemours (since 2015). She develops new refrigerants to be used in air conditioning and refrigeration systems, in Europe, North America, Australia and other countries.  As of 2018, 50% of all new vehicles produced by original equipment manufacturers (OEMs) are believed to use her refrigerant, HFO-1234yf, an important contribution to countering global warming.

Minor was one of five women to be named a Dupont Fellow in 2014, the first year that the company named women to its highest technical level. She was awarded the Perkin Medal in 2018.

Life
Minor graduated from Bucknell University in 1981 with a Bachelor of Science in chemical engineering.

Career
Minor worked at DuPont from 1981 to 2015, when she moved to the spinoff company Chemours in Wilmington, Delaware.
Minor develops new refrigerants for air conditioning and refrigeration systems. Her work supports the phasing out of ozone depleting chlorofluorocarbons and hydrochlorofluorocarbons, and of hydrofluorocarbons that contribute to global warming.

Minor was the technical leader for the research group at DuPont that developed HFO-1234yf, a hydrofluoroolefin that can reduce emissions from automotive air conditioning by more than 99%. 
HFO-1234yf has a much lower global warming potential (GWP) than the previously-used R-134a: its 100-year GWP was originally calculated as 4, and later recalculated as <1, compared to 1430 for R-134a. HFO-1234yf also has a lower atmospheric lifetime (11 days compared to 14 years), and higher energy efficiency under many conditions.

The Dupont team worked jointly with researchers at Honeywell. As a replacement for R-134a, HFO-1234yf is marketed as Opteon yf by Dupont (later Chemours), and as Solstice yf by Honeywell. 
As of 2018, 50% of new vehicles produced by original equipment manufacturers (OEMs) are believed to use HFO-1234yf for air conditioning.

Minor helped to develop both the XP (2014) and XL (2016) lines of refrigerant for Dupont and Chemours. 
In addition to alternative refrigerants for use in automobiles, 
more ecologically-friendly refrigerants have been developed for supermarket refrigeration systems (XP40) 
commercial freezers (XL20), 
reach-in coolers and freezers (R450A),
beverage coolers (HFO-1234yf),
large building chillers (XP30),
transport units with self-contained refrigeration (XP44)
direct expansion air conditioning, chilled water air conditioning and heat pumps (XL41, XL55).
Minor is also a co-inventor of Dupont's ISCEON MO99 (R438A), a possible replacement for R22, and Suva 95 (R508B), a possible replacement for R13 and R503.
A number of these refrigerants involve HFO/HFC blends.

Minor holds more than 160 patents in the United States, for her work on refrigerants, cleaning agents, and aerosol propellants.

She is a member of the American Society of Heating, Refrigeration and Air Conditioning Engineers (ASHRAE) and the Air-Conditioning, Heating, and Refrigeration Institute (AHRI). She has chaired the AHRI's Research group and the AHRTI's Technology and Steering committees.

Awards
 2003: featured DuPont scientist, Woman Engineer magazine
 2010: DuPont Sustainable Growth Award for HFO-1234yf
 2014: Dupont Fellow
 2016: Distinguished Service Award, American Society of Heating, Refrigeration and Air Conditioning Engineers (ASHRAE)
 2017: Distinguished Engineering Alumni Award, Bucknell University College of Engineering and the Bucknell Engineering Alumni Association
 2018: Perkin Medal

References

External links
 

Year of birth missing (living people)
Living people
Scientists from Delaware
20th-century American chemists
20th-century American women scientists
20th-century American inventors
21st-century American inventors
American women chemists
Bucknell University alumni
DuPont people
Women inventors
21st-century American women